

See also

Lists of fossiliferous stratigraphic units in Europe
Lists of fossiliferous stratigraphic units in the United Kingdom

References
 

England
United Kingdom geology-related lists
England geography-related lists